Jonas Björkman and Nicklas Kulti won in the final 6–4, 6–4 against Yevgeny Kafelnikov and Menno Oosting.

Seeds
Champion seeds are indicated in bold text while text in italics indicates the round in which those seeds were eliminated.

 Patrick Galbraith /  Andrei Olhovskiy (first round)
 Cyril Suk /  Daniel Vacek (quarterfinals)
 Patrick McEnroe /  Sandon Stolle (quarterfinals)
 Yevgeny Kafelnikov /  Menno Oosting (final)

Draw

References
 1996 European Community Championships Doubles Draw

ECC Antwerp
1996 ATP Tour